Candanal (variant: Santa María de Candanal) is one of 41 parishes (administrative divisions) in Villaviciosa, a municipality within the province and autonomous community of Asturias, in northern Spain. 

Villages and hamlets
 Argañoso
 Barromán
 Cabañes
 Capión
 Carvallal
 Collado
 Fiensospín
 Gallinal
 Grandiella
 Manzanedo
 Préstamo
 Pumar de Abad
 Requejo
 Roces
 La Rotella
 Los Salgueros
 Santa Cecilia
 El Tuyu

References  

Parishes in Villaviciosa